John George Prchlik (July 20, 1925 – December 31, 2003) was a professional American football defensive lineman in the National Football League.

Early life 
Prchlik was born the eldest of four siblings in Cleveland. His brother, Richard, became a politician and professor in Colorado. Raised in a Czech immigrant community, he did not learn English until he went to school. After graduating from Cleveland West Technical High School, he was nominated for an officers training program at Yale University, where he was a classmate of George H. W. Bush and William F. Buckley Jr.

College 
He served as an Ensign on the aircraft carrier, the USS White Plains in the Pacific War in the middle of his college career. After the war ended, he returned to New Haven, Connecticut, where he lettered in football, wrestling. As a college All-American, he played in both the 1948 East West Shrine game and the College All Star game.

Career 
After playing college football at Yale, Prchlik was drafted by the Boston Yanks in the 30th round (277th overall) in the 1947 NFL Draft. He played five seasons for the Detroit Lions including their 1952 and 1953 Championship seasons and in the 1951 and 1952 seasons was defensive captain. In the off season, he worked towards his law degree and graduated from Wayne State University Law School in 1952. He was an executive at Ford Motor Company for 30 years.

Personal life 
Prchlik married his wife, Patricia Hallihan, a local resident in 1949. Prchlik's nephew, Andrew Perchlik, in an environmental activist and member of the Vermont Senate.

Prchlik died December 31, 2003 of pancreatic cancer in Fairfield Glade, Tennessee at age 78.
</ref>

References

1925 births
2003 deaths
Players of American football from Cleveland
American football defensive linemen
Yale Bulldogs football players
Detroit Lions players
Deaths from pancreatic cancer
Deaths from cancer in Tennessee
United States Navy personnel of World War II
United States Navy officers